Small nucleolar RNA, C/D box 48 is a protein that in humans is encoded by the SNORD48 gene.

References